Péter Stark  (born 17 August 1978 in Kazincbarcika) is a Hungarian football player who currently plays for Pécsi Mecsek FC.

External links

https://web.archive.org/web/20070624191104/http://www.starkpeter.hu/
http://www.eto.hu

1978 births
Living people
Hungarian footballers
Hungary international footballers
Hungarian expatriate footballers
Győri ETO FC players
Expatriate footballers in Turkey
Kocaelispor footballers
Pécsi MFC players
Association football defenders